Ḫattušili (Ḫattušiliš in the inflected nominative case) was the regnal name of three Hittite kings:
Ḫattušili I (Labarna II)
Ḫattušili II
Ḫattušili III

It was also the name of two Neo-Hittite kings:

Ḫattušili I (Labarna II)
Ḫattušili II